Cannabidiolic acid (CBDA), is a cannabinoid found in cannabis plants. It is most abundant in the glandular trichomes on the female seedless flowers or more accurately infructescence often colloquially referred to as buds. CBDA is the chemical precursor to cannabidiol (CBD). Through the process of decarboxylation  cannabidol is derived via a loss of a carbon and two oxygen atoms from the 1 position of the benzoic acid ring. Cannabinoids are a class of compounds that are essentially unique to the cannabis genus.  Both marijuana and hemp belong to this genus.

Chemical composition

Cannabidiolic acid is biosynthesized by Cannabidiolic acid synthase from the conjugation of olivetolic acid and cannabigerolic acid. CBDA is not produced by man, but it is naturally occurs in hemp.  It is a raw compound which is found in the flowering buds of the female cannabis plant.

References

Benzoic acids
Cannabinoids
2,6-Dihydroxybiphenyls